Eddie DeGarmo (born October 3, 1954) is an American contemporary Christian music recording artist, keyboardist, producer and singer. He became best friends with guitarist/lead vocalist Dana Key in first grade, and co-founded the Christian rock group DeGarmo and Key with him in 1978. DeGarmo played keyboards and provided vocals for the band.

DeGarmo was one of the founders of Christian music label ForeFront Records. After almost twenty years performing with DeGarmo and Key, DeGarmo influenced other areas of the Christian music industry as an executive at ForeFront Records. DeGarmo, like Key, hails from Memphis, Tennessee. He is the uncle of singer and Broadway actress Diana DeGarmo.

Discography

External links
Eddie DeGarmo Interview NAMM Oral History Library (2013)

American performers of Christian music
Musicians from Memphis, Tennessee
1954 births
Living people
Place of birth missing (living people)
The Swirling Eddies members